The Steel City Yellow Jackets are a basketball team based in Pittsburgh, Pennsylvania. The team is a member of the American Basketball Association. They play their home games at the A Giving Heart Community Center.

The Yellow Jackets began play on November 8, 2014 as an expansion team competing in the ABA Northeast Division. The Yellow Jackets played all of their first season home games at the Community College of Allegheny County Allegheny Campus, which is located on Pittsburgh's North Shore, directly behind Heinz Field.
The Steel City Yellow Jackets were originally owned by national recording Hip hop artist Antjuan "Tjuan Benafactor" Washington and Averill 'Ace' Pippens, who also serves as the team's general manager and head coach. Pippens, also known as "Coach Ace", was the assistant coach at Pittsburgh's David B. Oliver High School before becoming assistant, and eventually head coach, of the Penn State McKeesport men's basketball team. Pippens' led Penn State McKeesport to a championship title in 2006.

After winning the ABA Northeast Division the Yellow Jackets hosted the two-day division playoff. A semifinal victory over Staten Island Vipers put Steel City in the division championship where they lost 106-105 to the Philadelphia Spirit.

In 2022, the Yellow Jackets won their first ABA national championship by defeating Team Trouble 123-118.

Season-by-season

References

External links
Official website

American Basketball Association (2000–present) teams
Basketball teams in Pittsburgh